Stretchheads were a punk band from Erskine, Scotland active between 1987 and 1991, releasing two albums in that period.

History
The band was formed in 1987 by Richie Dempsey (drums)., P6 (aka "Fat Bastard", "Wilberforce", real name Phil Eaglesham, vocals),  Mofungo Diggs (Steven MacDougall, bass) and Andy MacDonald (aka "Dr. Technology", guitar). The band wore asbestos firewear, gas masks, dubious ethnic shirts and balaclavas on stage, and blossomed despite depressing support slots with indie establishment acts such as Happy Mondays, The Wonderstuff and The Shamen. They began their recording career on the Moksha Recordings label run by arch psychopath Charlie Cosh with the Bros are Pish EP, poking fun at then chart-toppers Bros, among others. This resulted in discussion in a Smash Hits interview, with Craig explaining to the Goss brothers what 'Pish' Meant. Their debut album, Five Fingers, Four Thingers, a Thumb, a Facelift and a New Identity followed in 1989. Cosh has since, despite his establishment record industry credentials subsequently held the band to ransom for the original demo tapes. After recording the Blast First financed recording sessions at Shabby Road in Kilmarnock, Dempsey departed to join Dawson, and was replaced by Mr. Jason (Jason Boyce) of the Dandelion Adventure, and the band were signed up by top indie label Blast First. Their first release on Blast First was the 1990 EP Eyeball Origami Aftermath Wit Vegetarian Leg. A further single 23 Skinner followed in January 1991 before their second album was issued, Pish In Your Sleazebag. Touring Europe and playing shows with Dutch band Revenge Of The Carrots and old colleagues Dog Faced Hermans, the band split up in 1991, before which they recorded a session reluctantly granted due to John Walters antibodies to what he saw as 'Northern Comedycore' for John Peel's BBC Radio 1 show. A year later, their last, posthumous, release was the Barbed Anal Exciter EP. This was originally intended as a full live/studio split album but technical difficulties at the former Splash One venue could not be overcome. 

Phil Eaglesham and Richie Dempsey went on to be members of DeSalvo, along with Allan Stewart of Idlewild and Alex Grant, formerly of pHFamily  (along With Richie Dempsey) and Idlewild. The band developed a confrontational and sexually aggressive reputation and released their debut album on Mogwai's Rock Action Records in 2008, they became infamous for arousing live performance. p6 continues to perform with Joe Ahmed of The Chekists as 'Security' and has recorded several solo and collaborative performance art releases on his Naloxone Sounds label, including work with Jer Reid of Dawson and performance artist FK Alexander and a Stretchheads retrospective cassette box set. Richie Dempsey went on to play with several bands and become a prolific live and recording engineer for Scottish bands and has since rejoined former Dawson members in the band Sumshapes. He continues to record, perform and works as a sound engineer. He and Mofungo Diggs also continue to tour manage several current high profile Scottish bands.

Musical style
Musically they were influenced by both the US independent hardcore of Minor Threat and the Dead Kennedys and Butthole Surfers, Killdozer and British indie bands such as Big Flame and Bogshed as well as gaining connections with the inspiring Dutch / Belgian anarchist scene and collectives via The Ex and took the sound of those bands to a new extreme. They have since been compared to both US Post-Hardcore bands Jack 'o' Nuts and the Japanese noise rock of the Boredoms and Ruins. p6's vocals have been described as "inhuman, reminiscent of nothing so much as Sesame Street's Grover with electrodes affixed to his genitals", with their music described as "the weirdest, fastest and heaviest thing ever to come cartwheeling out of Scotland".

Discography

Albums
Five Fingers, Four Thingers, a Thumb, a Facelift and a New Identity (1989) Moksha Recordings (1000 Copies)
Pish In Your Sleazebag (1991) Blast First

Singles and EPs
Bros are Pish Etched 7" EP (1988) Moksha Recordings (500 Copies)
Eyeball Origami Aftermath Wit Vegetarian Leg 7" EP (1990) Blast First
"23 Skinner (Have a Bang on This Number)" 12" (1991) Blast First
Barbed Anal Exciter 10" EP (1000 copies) (1993) Blast First

Other rarities
'Three Steps To Heaven' - Cassette EP (1987) (50 copies)
'Asylum Suck' - A Pox On The Poll Tax Compilation LP (1988) (Revolt)
'Collectivisation Of Breasts In Moscow' - Media Pack (1989) (3 Copies)
'Groin Death' & '3 Pottery Owls' on Pathological Compilation 1989
'Spanish Castle Magic' on 'If 6 Was 9' Hendrix Tribute (1989)(Imaginary)
'Jimi's Magic Spanish Castle (Live)' - Flexi, Catalogue Magazine 1989
'Manic Depression (Live) - Flexi, Ablaze! Magazine 1989
'Born To Be Wild (In the Style Of Bogshed)' - Unreleased Steppenwolf Tribute 1989 (Imaginary)
'Eyeball Origami Aftermath Wit Vegetarian Leg' VHS Promo 1990
John Peel Radio Session, BBC June 1991
P6 Lyric Booklet - Ltd Edition of 23, 1998
Oregano Accumulator - Live Aktions 1989-90 & Remix Compilation 2013

References

External links
Stretchheads on Myspace

Scottish rock music groups
Blast First artists
Scottish punk rock groups